North West Brook is an unincorporated community located in Trinity Bay in Newfoundland and Labrador, on the Southern Shore of the Southwest Arm.

Populated places in Newfoundland and Labrador